Cosmosalia nigrolineata is a species of beetle in the family Cerambycidae. It was described by Bland in 1865.

References

Lepturinae
Beetles described in 1865